Pae (Estonian for "Limestone") is a subdistrict in the district of Lasnamäe, Tallinn, the capital of Estonia. It has a population of 13,918.

Gallery

References

Subdistricts of Tallinn